W. Steve Albrecht is the Andersen Alumni Professor at the Marriott School of Management of Brigham Young University (BYU).  He is a former president of the American Accounting Association and was previously president of the Association of Certified Fraud Examiners.  He was also formerly an associate dean of the Marriott School of Management.  Albrecht served as the  mission president for the Church of Jesus Christ of Latter-day Saints in Tokyo, Japan.

Albrecht has a bachelor's degree from BYU and a Ph.D. in accounting and an M.B.A. from the University of Wisconsin–Madison.  He was a professor at  the University of Illinois before he joined the BYU faculty in 1977.  He was also previously an employee of Deloitte & Touche.

Albrecht is a certified public accountant, a Certified Internal Auditor and a Certified Fraud Examiner.

From 1990 to 1998 Albrecht was the director of BYU's School of Accounting.

Albrecht was president of the Association of Certified Fraud Examiners from 1989 to 1992 and the president of the American Accounting Association from 1997 to 1998.

Albrecht has served on the boards of directors of SkyWest Airlines, Cypress Semiconductor, Red Hat, Inc., ICON Health & Fitness and Bonneville International.

Albrecht is married to the former LeAnn Christiansen.  They are the parents of six children.

References

External links
Analysis Group bio of Albrecht
Forbes bio of Albrecht
Wheatley Institute bio of Albrecht

Brigham Young University alumni
Brigham Young University faculty
Wisconsin School of Business alumni
University of Illinois faculty
American accountants
Living people
Latter Day Saints from Illinois
Latter Day Saints from Utah
American Mormon missionaries in Japan
Year of birth missing (living people)